Jean-Louis Hodoul (born 1 April 1946 in Marseille) is a French former professional footballer. He played as a defender for Marseille, SC Bastia and Troyes AC.

Hodoul played for France at the 1968 Summer Olympics.

References

External links
 
 
 Player profile at om1899

1946 births
Living people
Footballers from Marseille
Association football defenders
French footballers
Olympique de Marseille players
SC Bastia players
ES Troyes AC players
Ligue 1 players
Ligue 2 players
Olympic footballers of France
Footballers at the 1968 Summer Olympics
Competitors at the 1967 Mediterranean Games
Mediterranean Games gold medalists for France
Mediterranean Games medalists in football